Disco is a French film directed by Fabien Onteniente, which was released on 2 April 2008, with Franck Dubosc as "Didier Travolta" in the main role.

The main subject of this movie is the rebirth of disco music at the mid-2000s in a town of France. The film is at first humorous, with a lot of clichés about Saturday Night Fever, but it doesn't disparage the disco culture at any time. In fact, all the people involved in this film are fans of disco, dance and funk music.

The soundtrack to the film contains a cover version of the Bee Gees' "Night Fever" performed by Australian singer and songwriter Tina Arena.

Cast
 Franck Dubosc as Didier Graindorge  Travolta
 Emmanuelle Béart as France Navarre
 Gérard Depardieu as Jean-François Civette a.k.a. Jean-François Jackson
 Samuel Le Bihan as Walter
 Abbes Zahmani as Neuneuil
 Annie Cordy as Madame Graindorge
 Isabelle Nanty as The Baroness
 François-Xavier Demaison as Guillaume Navarre
 Christine Citti as Coco
 Chloé Lambert as Cerise
 Danièle Lebrun as Mother Navarre
 Jacques Sereys as Father Navarre
 Jérôme Le Banner as Rodolphe
 Marie-Christine Adam as The hiring manager
 Chantal Banlier as Madame Sochard
 Christine Paolini as Madame Prunelli

References

External links 
 

2008 films
Films directed by Fabien Onteniente
Films scored by Michel Legrand
French musical comedy films
Disco films
Films set in the 2000s
2000s musical comedy films
2008 comedy films
2000s French films